The World Monuments Watch is a flagship advocacy program of the New York-based private non-profit organization World Monuments Fund (WMF) and American Express aimed at identifying and preserving the world’s most important endangered cultural landmarks. It targets selected sites for immediate action, to call attention to the need for innovative approaches to protect threatened sites throughout the world.

Selection process
Every two years, the program publishes a select list known as the Watch List of 100 Most Endangered Sites that is in urgent need of preservation funding and protection. The sites are nominated by governments, private organizations active in the field of heritage conservation, and concerned individuals. An independent panel of international experts then convene to evaluate and select 100 candidates from these entries to be part of the Watch List, based on the significance of the urgency of its situation, the viability of proposed remedies, and the site's overall significance. WMF and American Express award grants to sites included on the Watch List through the WMF Fund, which is composed of donations from corporate, individual and foundation sponsors. These grants are meant to support activities such as strategic planning, emergency and technical assistance, educational and local fund raising programs, and conservation treatment.

1996 Watch List
The 1996 World Monuments Watch List of 100 Most Endangered Sites was launched on August 4, 1995.

List by country/territory

Statistics by country/territory
The following countries/territories have multiple sites entered on the 1996 Watch List, listed by the number of sites:

Notes

A. Numbers list only meant as a guide on this article. No official reference numbers have been designated for the sites on the Watch List.
B. Names and spellings used for the sites were based on the official 1996 Watch List as published.
C. The references to the sites' locations were based on the official 1996 Watch List as published.

References

External links
World Monuments Fund home page
World Monuments Watch home page

Historic preservation